Presidential elections were held in the Comoros in 2002. In accordance with the new constitution approved in a referendum the previous year, the island of Grande Comore was to provide the candidates for this election as part of a rotation agreement between the three islands. A first round was held on Grande Comore on 17 March, after which the top three candidates, Azali Assoumani, Mahamoud Mradabi and Saïd Ali Kemal went through to a second, national round of voting on 14 April. However, both Mradabi and Kemal boycotted the second round, leaving Assoumani as the only candidate.

Results

References

Comoros
Presidential elections in the Comoros
President
Comoros
Comoros